Trap Hill or Traphill may refer to:

Trap Hill, West Virginia, an unincorporated community in Raleigh County
Traphill, North Carolina, a rural community located in northeastern Wilkes County